The lists of Michigan Wolverines football statistical leaders identify individual statistical leaders of the Michigan Wolverines football program in various offensive categories, including passing, rushing, and receptions.  Within those areas, the lists identify single-game, single-season and career leaders in yardage, number (receptions, rushes or passes), and touchdowns. Statistics accumulated after transferring from or before transferring to Michigan are not included here.  
The Michigan Wolverines football program is a college football team that represents the University of Michigan in the National Collegiate Athletic Association's Big Ten Conference.

Passing leaders.  Michigan's career leader in passing yardage is Chad Henne with 9,715 passing yards from 2004 to 2007.  Henne also holds the career records in completions (828) and touchdown passes (87).  John Navarre holds the records for passing yards in a single season (3,331), set during the 2003 season.  Devin Gardner holds the record for passing yards in a single game (503) against Indiana in 2013. Tom Brady holds the school's record for most completions in a game, having completed 34 passes against Alabama in the 2000 Orange Bowl.

Rushing leaders.  Michigan's career leader in rushing yards is Mike Hart with 5,040 rushing yards from 2004 to 2007.  Hart also holds the career record with 1,050 carries.  Tim Biakabutuka holds the single-season record with 1,818 rushing yards during the 1995 season.  Ron Johnson holds the single-game record with 347 rushing yards in a game against Wisconsin during the 1967 season.  Willie Heston, who played on Fielding H. Yost's "Point-a-Minute" teams from 1901 to 1904, holds the career record for rushing touchdowns with 72.  Albert Herrnstein holds the records for most rushing touchdowns in a season (26) and in a single game (7), having set those records for the 1902 team.

Receiving leaders.  Michigan receiving records are dominated by Braylon Edwards who played for Michigan from 2001 to 2004.  When Edwards finished, he held the records for most career receiving yards (3,541), receptions (252), and touchdowns (39).  In 2004, Edwards also set the single-season records for receiving yards (1,330) and receptions (97).  However, in 2013 his single-season record for receiving yards was surpassed by Jeremy Gallon, who finished the season with 1,373 yards.  Heisman Trophy winner Desmond Howard holds the single season record with 19 touchdown catches during the 1991 season.  Michigan's single-game records are held by Jeremy Gallon (369 receiving yards, Indiana, October 19, 2013), Marquise Walker (15 receptions twice, Ohio State, November 24, 2001 and Washington, September 8, 2001), and Derrick Alexander (4 touchdown receptions, Minnesota, October 24, 1992).

Historical caveats.  Although Michigan began competing in intercollegiate football in 1879, the school's official statistical database only tracks offensive statistics since 1949. Definitive tracking of most defensive statistics dates only to 1965, and tracking of sacks did not start until 1979. Field goal statistics have only been included since 1984, and a complete database of field goal statistics (i.e., down to the level of individual games) dates only to 1997.

Because the official database commences in 1949, many statistical achievements are overlooked in these lists.  For example, Dick Rifenburg's career receiving statistics are not included in the official database despite the fact that his 16 career and eight single-season touchdowns were recognized as school records until 1980.

Where pre-1949 records are available from reliable sources, they have been included below with yellow shading.  Because there is no complete database of pre-1949 records, such records are incomplete and may not be considered "official" records.

With playing seasons extending progressively from relatively short four-games seasons in the 19th century to the current 12-game regular seasons, conference championship games, and bowl games, and with players being eligible to play four years of college football starting in 1972, as well as the NCAA's decision to not count the COVID-affected 2020 season against the athletic eligibility of any football player, the lists tend to be dominated by more recent players.

Passing

Completions

Passing yards

Passing touchdowns

Rushing

Rushing yards

Rushing touchdowns
Records for years prior to 1949 are not included in the University of Michigan's statistical records database.  Where pre-1949 records are available from reliable sources, they have been included below with yellow shading.  Because there is no complete database of pre-1949 records, such records are incomplete and may not be considered "official" records.  Unless otherwise indicated, touchdown totals in this section are taken from the 2011 Michigan Football Record Book.

Receiving

Receptions

Receiving yards

Receiving touchdowns

Total offense
Total offense is the sum of passing and rushing statistics. It does not include receiving or returns.

Michigan does not include total offense records in its current statistical database.

Total offense yards

Touchdowns responsible for 
"Touchdowns responsible for" is the official NCAA designation for combined passing and rushing touchdowns.

Defense

Interceptions

Tackles

Sacks

Kicking

Field goals made

Field goal percentage

Margin of victory

Season

Game (overall)

Game (modern era)

References

Michigan

Michigan Wolverines football statistical leaders